İlyas Salman (born 14 January 1949) is a Turkish actor, film director, author, screenwriter and musician.

He shared the Adana Golden Boll International Film Festival's Best Actor Award in 2012 together with Engin Günaydın.

Personal life
Salman was born on 14 January 1949 in Arguvan, Malatya. His family originate from the Asar neighborhood in Arguvan. He was accepted as a Kurd because of the Kurdish typologies he had played for many years. In 2007, in an article written by himself and later in a book he revealed that he was an Alevi Turkmen.

He is a supporter of the left-wing. He participated at Communist Party of Turkey's rally in Kartal on 1 May 2006. He is one of the contributors to Turkish Left magazine.

Karanfil Kokuyor Cıgaram
As of 1 October 2009, he wanted to start performing a show called "Karanfil Kokuyor Cıgaram" where he would read the poems from the book "Hasretinden Prangalar Eskittim" by Ahmed Arif in Bakırköy Art Center. The visual director of the show would be his son Temmuz Salman. His daughter Devrim Salman would be the soloist on the show. However, due to some temporary health problems of İlyas Salman, the program was postponed for a while.

Filmography

Actor

Films

TV shows

Director and screenwriter

References

External links
 

1949 births
Living people
Film people from Istanbul
Turkish male film actors
Best Actor Golden Boll Award winners
Turkish film directors
Ankara State Conservatory alumni
Turkish male television actors
Turkish former Muslims
Turkish atheists